The Thelonious Monk Orchestra at Town Hall is an album by Thelonious Monk, released in 1959. The concert included Hall Overton’s arrangements on Monk’s tunes (including a transcription of Monk's piano solo on "Little Rootie Tootie").

The concert features, among others, Charlie Rouse on tenor in his first recording with Monk. Rouse went on to record and perform live with Monk through 1969.

Track listing

The 1959 vinyl album
Side one
 "Thelonious" – 0:56
 "Friday The 13th"   – 9:22
 "Monk's Mood" – 10:15
Side two
 "Little Rootie Tootie" – 8:45
 "Off Minor" – 7:47
 "Crepuscule With Nellie" – 4:42

The 2006 CD rerelease
 "Thelonious" – 3:04
 "Friday The 13th"   – 9:34
 "Monk's Mood" – 10:27
 "Little Rootie Tootie" – 8:56
 "Off Minor" – 7:56
 "Crepuscule With Nellie" – 4:53
 "Little Rootie Tootie (Encore)" – 8:29
 "In Walked Bud" - 7:09
 "Blue Monk" - 8:21
 "Rhythm-a-Ning" - 6:45

Personnel 
 Thelonious Monk — piano
 Donald Byrd — trumpet
 Eddie Bert — trombone
 Robert Northern — French horn
 Jay McAllister — tuba
 Phil Woods — alto saxophone
 Charlie Rouse — tenor saxophone
 Pepper Adams — baritone saxophone
 Sam Jones — bass
 Art Taylor — drums

Tributes 
As from 2010, American jazz pianist Jason Moran went on tour with his project IN MY MIND,  a multimedia presentation heavily inspired by Thelonious Monk's concert at The Town Hall.

References

Albums produced by Orrin Keepnews
Thelonious Monk live albums
1959 live albums
Albums recorded at the Town Hall